USNS Yuma (T-EPF-8) is the eighth  and operated by the United States Navys Military Sealift Command. It is the fourth ship in naval service named after Yuma, Arizona.

The ship was christened on 20 August 2016 by ship's sponsor Janet Napolitano and launched at Austal USA in Mobile, Alabama on 17 September 2016. The Yuma completed acceptance trials on 26 January 2017 and its delivery was accepted by the U.S. Navy on 21 April 2017.

References

External links

 

Transports of the United States Navy
Ships built in Mobile, Alabama
Spearhead-class Joint High Speed Vessels
2016 ships